Cañuelas Partido is a partido of Buenos Aires Province in Argentina.

Sports
Cañuelas is home to Cañuelas FC, a football club currently playing in the regional 4th Division of Argentine football.

Towns
Cañuelas district capital: 24,483 inhabitants
Alejandro Petión: 2,874 inhabitants
Barrio El Taladro: 134 inhabitants
Gobernador Udaondo: 277 inhabitants
La Noria
Máximo Paz
Petion
Santa Rosa: 3,771 inhabitants
Uribelarrea: 1,147 inhabitants
Vicente Casares: 629 inhabitants

References

External links

 
 Cañuelas Website
 Cañuelas and Uribelarrea Website

Partidos of Buenos Aires Province